Eduardo Jesus Pedemonte, Jr. (born July 23, 2003) is a footballer who plays as a midfielder for the City College of San Francisco Rams. Born and raised in the mainland United States to a Peruvian father and a Guamanian mother, he is capped for the Guam national team.

Youth career
Pedemonte played high school soccer for South San Francisco High School until graduating in 2021. He was named the San Francisco Daily Journal's Player of the Week in January 2019.

College career
For the 2021–2022 season, Pedemonte began playing college soccer in the United States for the Rams of City College of San Francisco.

International career
In May 2021 Pedemonte was called up to Guam's senior squad for a 2022 FIFA World Cup qualification match against China. He went on to make his senior international debut in the eventual 0–7 defeat on 30 May 2021.

International career statistics

References

External links

CCSF Rams profile
CCCAA profile

2002 births
Living people
Association football midfielders
Guamanian footballers
Guam international footballers